Kiddy Girl-and is a 2009 sequel to the science fiction anime series Kiddy Grade.

Episode list

Kiddy Girl-and